The Shikarpur bombing occurred on January 30, 2015 when Sunni militants linked to the Pakistani Taliban killed 61 people and injured 50 in a bombing at a Shiite mosque in the Shikarpur District of Pakistan's Sindh province.

Jundallah claimed responsibility for the attack.

References

External links
 https://web.archive.org/web/20150417144727/http://www.satp.org/satporgtp/detailed_news.asp?date1=1/31/2015&id=1#1
 
2015 murders in Pakistan
2015 in Sindh
2010s crimes in Sindh
21st-century mass murder in Pakistan
Attacks in Pakistan in 2015
Attacks on buildings and structures in Sindh
Attacks on Shiite mosques in Pakistan
Improvised explosive device bombings in 2015
Improvised explosive device bombings in Sindh
Mosque bombings by Islamists
Islamic terrorist incidents in 2015
January 2015 crimes in Asia
January 2015 events in Pakistan
Mass murder in 2015
Mass murder in Sindh
Bombing
Terrorist incidents in Pakistan in 2015
Mosque bombings in Pakistan
Jundallah (Pakistan) attacks